Kavita Seth (born 14 September 1970) is an Indian singer, who is most known as a playback singer in Hindi cinema, as well as a performer of Ghazals and Sufi music, and leads a Sufi musical group, Karwaan Group.

She won the Filmfare Award for Best Female Playback Singer in 2010 for her classical Sufi rendition "Gunja Sa Koi Iktara" for the film Wake Up Sid (2009). She also won the Star Screen Award for Best Female Playback for the same song, which was one of the biggest chartbusters in 2009.

Early life

She was born in Bareilly, Uttar Pradesh in a middle class family of a bank officer

Career
 

Kavita specialises in Sufi-style singing although she also sings geet, ghazal and folk songs. Over the years she has performed at live shows at London, Birmingham, Scotland, Berlin, Oslo and Stockholm and places across India. It was at one of her performance at Muzaffar Ali's International Sufi Festival concert, in Delhi that director Satish Kaushik heard her and offered a song "Zindagi ko Maula", in his film, the Amisha Patel starrer, Vaada (2005), marking her debut as a playback singer. Subsequently, she moved to Mumbai, as this was followed by, "Mujhe Mat Roko" in Anurag Basu's Gangster (2006), for which she received praise.

Besides singing she also composes music. She has composed three songs in N. Chandra's film "Yeh Mera India" (2009). She has also released private albums, including, Woh Ek Lamha, Dil-e-Nadan both Sufi ghazal albums, followed by Sufi music albums, Sufiana (2008) and Hazrat. Her 2008 album Sufiana, composed of couplets of Sufi poet-mystic, Rumi was released at the 800-year-old Khaman Pir Ka Dargah in Lucknow.

In 2020, Kavita composed the soundtrack of the BBC TV series A Suitable Boy, while also giving vocals to the songs of Tabu's character in the show.

Awards and nominations

|-
| 5th Mirchi Music Awards
Female Vocalist of The Year – "Tum Hi Ho Bandhu"
| 
|}

Filmography

Playback singer

Music director

Personal life
She has two sons, Kavish Seth and Kanishk Seth, both of whom perform with her. Her husband K.K.Seth died of pancreatitis on 15 December 2011, aged 48.

Albums
 Sufiana (2007)
 Kabirana Sufiana (2010)
 Bulleh Shah (2010)
 Khuda Wohi Hai (2011)
 Ek Din (2012)
 Trance With Khusrow (2014)
 Lagan Laagi Re (2021)

References

 Kavita Seth Interview

External links
 
 Sufi Singer Kavita Seth Discography
 Sufi and the voice
 Sufi Singer Kavita Seth Website

Living people
Bollywood playback singers
Indian women playback singers
People from Bareilly
Performers of Sufi music
Delhi University alumni
Indian women classical singers
Singers from Uttar Pradesh
Women musicians from Uttar Pradesh
21st-century Indian singers
21st-century Indian women singers
1970 births
Filmfare Awards winners
Screen Awards winners
International Indian Film Academy Awards winners